Kishleyevo is a rural locality (a selo) in Tolpukhovskoye Rural Settlement, Sobinsky District, Vladimir Oblast, Russia. The population was 396 as of 2010. There are 9 streets.

Geography 
Kishleyevo is located 33 km north of Sobinka (the district's administrative centre) by road. Danilovka is the nearest rural locality.

References 

Rural localities in Sobinsky District
Vladimirsky Uyezd